AAQ or Aaq may refer to:

 Anapa Airport, Russia, IATA code AAQ
 Eastern Abenaki language, ISO 939-3 language code aaq
 Dopaminergic cell group Aaq
 the Swiss Agency of Accreditation and Quality Assurance (AAQ)

See also

AN/AAQ	(Airborne Infrared Multipurpose/Special Equipment), in the Joint Electronics Type Designation System